Ossie Moore (born 6 July 1958) is an Australian professional golfer.

Early life 
Moore was born in Murwillumbah.

Professional career 
Moore played on the European Tour from 1984 to 1991. His best finish was second at the 1987 PLM Open. Moore also played on the PGA Tour of Australasia, winning the Order of Merit in 1985. He won the Queensland PGA Championship twice.

Amateur wins
1981 Australian Amateur

Professional wins (5)

PGA Tour of Australasia wins (3)

Other wins (2)
1984 Nedlands Masters
1992 Queensland PGA Championship (non-tour event)

Team appearances
Amateur
Sloan Morpeth Trophy (representing Australia): 1982 (tied)
Australian Men's Interstate Teams Matches (representing Queensland): 1977, 1978, 1979 (winners), 1981, 1982

Professional
World Cup (representing Australia): 1987

References

External links

Australian male golfers
PGA Tour of Australasia golfers
European Tour golfers
Sportsmen from New South Wales
1958 births
Living people